Kilmonivaig is a small village, situated close to the southeast end of Loch Lochy in Spean Bridge, Inverness-shire, Scottish Highlands and is in the Scottish council area of Highland.

Fort William lies approximately 15 miles southwest of Kilmonivaig.

Parish of Kilmonivaig
Kilmonivaig is also the name of the large parish which has its Church of Scotland parish church one kilometer from the bridge at Spean Bridge on the north side of the river. Kilmonivaig was one of the two constituent parishes which traditionally made up Lochaber.

A memorial to the Commandos, who trained at nearby Achnacarry, is situated on a vantage point above Spean Bridge looking out over Kilmonivaig. The work of sculptor Scott Sutherland, it was cast by H.H. Martyn of Cheltenham and unveiled by Her Majesty Queen Elizabeth The Queen Mother on 27 September 1952.

Bridges of Kilmonivaig Parish
The villages of Roy Bridge and Spean Bridge both boast bridges designed by Thomas Telford between 1817 and 1819 and subsequently widened. Just downstream of Spean Bridge is the remains of High Bridge completed by General Wade in 1736 at a cost of £1,087.

Royal Heritage and battles
In 1431 a battle took place at Kilmonivaig between Donald Baleal, cousin of Alexander of Islay, Earl of Ross, then a state prisoner of Tantallon Castle and the Earls of Caithness. In this battle the royal forces were defeated and the Earl of Caithness was slain. In 1645 Montrose fought Argyll, with Argyll being defeated.

References

External links

Populated places in Lochaber
Civil parishes of Scotland